Events from the year 1521 in India.

Events
 Duarte de Menezes becomes governor of Portuguese India (until 1524)

References

See also

 Timeline of Indian history